Klintsovsky District is an administrative and municipal district (raion), one of the twenty-seven in Bryansk Oblast, Russia. It is located in the west of the oblast. Its administrative center is the town of Klintsy (which is not administratively a part of the district). Population:   23,581 (2002 Census);

Ecological problems 
As a result of the Chernobyl disaster on April 26, 1986, part of the territory of Bryansk Oblast has been contaminated with radionuclides (mainly Gordeyevsky, Klimovsky, Klintsovsky, Krasnogorsky, Surazhsky, and Novozybkovsky Districts). In 1999, some 226,000 people lived in areas with the contamination level above 5 Curie/km2, representing approximately 16% of the oblast's population.

Administrative and municipal status
Within the framework of administrative divisions, Klintsovsky District is one of the twenty-seven in the oblast. The town of Klintsy serves as its administrative center, despite being incorporated separately as an urban administrative okrug—an administrative unit with the status equal to that of the districts.

As a municipal division, the district is incorporated as Klintsovsky Municipal District. Klintsy Urban Administrative Okrug is incorporated separately from the district as Klintsy Urban Okrug.

References

Notes

Sources

Districts of Bryansk Oblast
